The El Sistema Sweden National Orchestra is the national youth orchestra of Sweden. Founded in 2019 by El Sistema Sweden and STIM, it consists of students of age 11 to 19 from all over Sweden. It is supported by the Royal Stockholm Philharmonic Orchestra and the Swedish Radio Symphony Orchestra.

See also 
 List of youth orchestras

References 

Music education organizations
National youth orchestras
Swedish orchestras
European youth orchestras
Musical groups established in 2019
2019 establishments in Sweden